The General Agreement on Trade in Services (GATS) is a treaty of the World Trade Organization (WTO) which entered into force in January 1995 as a result of the Uruguay Round negotiations. The treaty was created to extend the multilateral trading system to service sector, in the same way the General Agreement on Tariffs and Trade (GATT) provides such a system for merchandise trade.

All members of the WTO are parties to the GATS. The basic WTO principle of most favoured nation (MFN) applies to GATS as well. However, upon accession, members may introduce temporary exemptions to this rule.

Historical background

While the overall goal of GATS is to remove barriers to trade, members are free to choose which sectors are to be progressively "liberalised" (i.e. marketised and privatised); which mode of supply would apply to a particular sector; and to what extent that "liberalisation" will occur over a given period of time. Members' commitments are governed by a ratchet effect: commitments are one-way and are not to be wound back once entered into. The reason for the rule is to create a stable trading climate (i.e. a market). However, Article XXI allows members to withdraw commitments, and so far two members have exercised the option (US and EU). In November 2008, Bolivia gave a notification that it will withdraw its health services commitments.

Some activist groups consider that GATS risks undermining the ability and authority of governments to regulate commercial activities within their own boundaries, with the effect of ceding power to business interests ahead of the interests of citizens. In 2003, the GATSwatch network published a critical statement supported by over 500 organisations in 60 countries. At the same time, countries are not under any obligation to enter international agreements such as GATS. For countries that like to attract trade and investment, GATS adds a measure of transparency and legal predictability. Legal obstacles to services trade can have legitimate policy reasons, but they can also be an effective tool for large scale corruption.

(Four modes of supply)
The GATS agreement covers four modes of supply for the delivery of services in cross-border trade:

Sectors addressed
Services Sector Classifications addressed in the GATS are defined in the so-called "W/120 list", which provides a list of all sectors which can be negotiated under the GATS. The title refers to the name of the official WTO document, MTN.GNS/W/120. There are twelve service sectors (Business; Communication; Construction and Engineering; Distribution; Education; Environment; Financial; Health; Tourism and Travel; Recreation, Cultural, and Sporting; Transport; and "Other") divided into sub-sectors.

Criticisms 
The GATS agreement has been criticized for tending to substitute the authority of national legislation and judiciary with that of a GATS Disputes Panel conducting closed hearings. WTO member-government spokespersons are obliged to dismiss such criticism because of prior commitment to perceived benefits of prevailing commercial principles of competition and 'liberalisation'.

While national governments have the option to exclude any specific service from liberalisation under GATS, they are also under pressure from international business interests to refrain from excluding any service "provided on a commercial basis". Important public utilities such as water and electricity most commonly involve purchase by consumers and are thus demonstrably "provided on a commercial basis". The same may be said of many health and education services which are sought to be 'exported' by some countries as profitable industries.

This definition defines virtually any public service as being "provided on a commercial basis" and is already extending into such areas as police, the military, prisons, the justice system, public administration, and government. Over a fairly short time perspective, this could open up for the privatisation or marketisation of large parts, and possibly all, of what today are considered public services currently available for the whole population of a country as a social entitlement, to be restructured, marketised, contracted out to for-profit providers, and eventually fully privatised and available only to those who can pay for them. This process is currently far advanced in most countries, usually (and intentionally) without properly informing or consulting the public as to whether or not this is what they desire.

See also
European Services Forum
Foreign Affiliate Trade Statistics
Trade in Services
Trade in Services Statistics
World Development Movement
World Trade Organization

References

Further reading
Text of the General Agreement on Trade in Services [ wto.org]
Barlow, M. "The Last Frontier", The Ecologist Vol 31 No 1
Clift, R. Background Paper on the General Agreement on Trade in Services and Post-Secondary Education in Canada, cufa.bc.ca
GATS, Privatisation, and Health
World Development Movement
Union Network International

World Trade Organization agreements
Commercial treaties
Treaties entered into force in 1995
Treaties concluded in 1994
Treaties of Albania
Treaties of Angola
Treaties of Antigua and Barbuda
Treaties of Argentina
Treaties of Armenia
Treaties of Australia
Treaties of Austria
Treaties of Bahrain
Treaties of Bangladesh
Treaties of Barbados
Treaties of Belgium
Treaties of Belize
Treaties of Benin
Treaties of Bolivia
Treaties of Botswana
Treaties of Brazil
Treaties of Brunei
Treaties of Bulgaria
Treaties of Burkina Faso
Treaties of Burundi
Treaties of Cambodia
Treaties of Cameroon
Treaties of Canada
Treaties of Cape Verde
Treaties of the Central African Republic
Treaties of Chad
Treaties of Chile
Treaties of the People's Republic of China
Treaties of Taiwan
Treaties of Colombia
Treaties of the Republic of the Congo
Treaties of Costa Rica
Treaties of Ivory Coast
Treaties of Croatia
Treaties of Cuba
Treaties of Cyprus
Treaties of the Czech Republic
Treaties of the Democratic Republic of the Congo
Treaties of Denmark
Treaties of Djibouti
Treaties of Dominica
Treaties of the Dominican Republic
Treaties of Ecuador
Treaties of Egypt
Treaties of El Salvador
Treaties of Estonia
Treaties entered into by the European Union
Treaties of Fiji
Treaties of Finland
Treaties of France
Treaties of Gabon
Treaties of the Gambia
Treaties of Georgia (country)
Treaties of Germany
Treaties of Ghana
Treaties of Greece
Treaties of Grenada
Treaties of Guatemala
Treaties of Guinea
Treaties of Guinea-Bissau
Treaties of Guyana
Treaties of Haiti
Treaties of Honduras
Treaties of Hong Kong
Treaties of Hungary
Treaties of Iceland
Treaties of India
Treaties of Indonesia
Treaties of Ireland
Treaties of Israel
Treaties of Italy
Treaties of Jamaica
Treaties of Japan
Treaties of Jordan
Treaties of Kazakhstan
Treaties of Kenya
Treaties of Kuwait
Treaties of Kyrgyzstan
Treaties of Laos
Treaties of Latvia
Treaties of Lesotho
Treaties of Liechtenstein
Treaties of Lithuania
Treaties of Luxembourg
Treaties of Macau
Treaties of Madagascar
Treaties of Malawi
Treaties of Malaysia
Treaties of the Maldives
Treaties of Mali
Treaties of Malta
Treaties of Mauritania
Treaties of Mauritius
Treaties of Mexico
Treaties of Mongolia
Treaties of Montenegro
Treaties of Morocco
Treaties of Mozambique
Treaties of Myanmar
Treaties of Namibia
Treaties of Nepal
Treaties of the Netherlands
Treaties of New Zealand
Treaties of Nicaragua
Treaties of Niger
Treaties of Nigeria
Treaties of Norway
Treaties of Oman
Treaties of Pakistan
Treaties of Panama
Treaties of Papua New Guinea
Treaties of Paraguay
Treaties of Peru
Treaties of the Philippines
Treaties of Poland
Treaties of Portugal
Treaties of Qatar
Treaties of South Korea
Treaties of Moldova
Treaties of Romania
Treaties of Russia
Treaties of Rwanda
Treaties of Samoa
Treaties of Saudi Arabia
Treaties of Senegal
Treaties of Seychelles
Treaties of Sierra Leone
Treaties of Singapore
Treaties of Slovakia
Treaties of Slovenia
Treaties of the Solomon Islands
Treaties of South Africa
Treaties of Spain
Treaties of Sri Lanka
Treaties of Saint Kitts and Nevis
Treaties of Saint Lucia
Treaties of Saint Vincent and the Grenadines
Treaties of Suriname
Treaties of Eswatini
Treaties of Sweden
Treaties of Switzerland
Treaties of Tajikistan
Treaties of Thailand
Treaties of North Macedonia
Treaties of Togo
Treaties of Tonga
Treaties of Trinidad and Tobago
Treaties of Tunisia
Treaties of Turkey
Treaties of Uganda
Treaties of Ukraine
Treaties of the United Arab Emirates
Treaties of the United Kingdom
Treaties of Tanzania
Treaties of the United States
Treaties of Uruguay
Treaties of Vanuatu
Treaties of Venezuela
Treaties of Vietnam
Treaties of Yemen
Treaties of Zambia
Treaties of Zimbabwe
Treaties of Liberia